Torin Jamal Francis  (born June 26, 1983) is an American professional basketball player for La Union de Formosa of the Argentine Basketball League. He is 6'10" (2.10 m) tall and he plays at the center position. He has played professionally in Greece, Israel, Germany, Turkey, Belgium, and Italy.

College career
Francis played college basketball in the United States at the University of Notre Dame with the Notre Dame Fighting Irish.

Pro career
During his professional career, Francis has played with the Italian League clubs Orlandina Basket and Cantù. He has also played with the Greek League clubs AEL 1964, AEK Athens, and Panellinios Basket. He has also played with the Israeli League club Hapoel Jerusalem and the Turkish League club Bornova Belediye.

He was signed by Panellinios in January 2011.

In July 2011 he signed a two-year contract with Alba Berlin in Germany.

In the summer of 2012, he signed a contract with Aliağa Petkim.

On November 26, 2014, he signed with Belgian team Spirou Charleroi.

In November 2015, he signed with Argentinian team La Union de Formosa.

The Basketball Tournament (TBT)
In the summer of 2017, Francis, for the fourth year in a row, competed in The Basketball Tournament on ESPN for D.C. on Point. Competing for the $2 million grand prize, Ramón scored 15 points and grabbed nine rebounds in 30 minutes of play as D.C. on Point fell 80–75 to Team FOE, a Philadelphia based team coached by NBA forwards Markieff and Marcus Morris.  Prior to 2017, Francis competed for Southern Hospitality in 2016 and for the Notre Dame Fighting Alumni in 2014 and 2015.

References

External links
NBA.com Draft Profile
Eurocup Profile
Eurobasket.com Profile
Turkish League Profile
Italian League Profile 
Greek League Profile 
Draftexpress.com Profile
AEK.com Profile
Notre Dame College Bio

1983 births
Living people
A.E.L. 1964 B.C. players
AEK B.C. players
Alba Berlin players
Aliağa Petkim basketball players
American expatriate basketball people in Argentina
American expatriate basketball people in Belgium
American expatriate basketball people in Germany
American expatriate basketball people in Greece
American expatriate basketball people in Israel
American expatriate basketball people in Italy
American expatriate basketball people in Turkey
American men's basketball players
Basketball players from Boston
Bornova Belediye players
Boston Latin School alumni
Centers (basketball)
Eskişehir Basket players
Greek Basket League players
Hapoel Jerusalem B.C. players
Israeli Basketball Premier League players
La Unión basketball players
McDonald's High School All-Americans
Notre Dame Fighting Irish men's basketball players
Orlandina Basket players
Pallacanestro Cantù players
Panellinios B.C. players
Parade High School All-Americans (boys' basketball)
People from Roslindale
Power forwards (basketball)
Spirou Charleroi players
Tabor Academy (Massachusetts) alumni